Than Htet Aung (born 1 June 1992 is a footballer from Burma and a forward for Samut Sakhon. In December 2017, he transferred to  Zwekapin United.

International career

International goals
Scores and results list Myanmar's goal tally first.

References

External links

1993 births
Living people
Burmese footballers
Myanmar international footballers
Yangon United F.C. players
Sportspeople from Yangon
Association football forwards